Urnyakovo (Ürnäk) is a rural locality (a village) in Dyumeyevsky Selsoviet, Ilishevsky District, Bashkortostan, Russia. The population was 119 as of 2010. There is 1 street.

Geography 
Urnyakovo is located 31 km south of Verkhneyarkeyevo (the district's administrative centre) by road. Taktagulovo is the nearest rural locality.

References 

Rural localities in Ilishevsky District